Naoki Shimura (born 27 November 1941) is a Japanese ski jumper. He competed in the normal hill and large hill events at the 1964 Winter Olympics.

References

1941 births
Living people
Japanese male ski jumpers
Olympic ski jumpers of Japan
Ski jumpers at the 1964 Winter Olympics
Sportspeople from Hokkaido